Acin is a surname. Notable people with the surname include:
Andrej Aćin (b. 1972), Serbian director
Ramón Acín (1888-1936), Spanish anarcho-syndicalist

See also
Asociación de Cabildos Indígenas del Norte del Cauca, Colombian indigenous rights organization
ac.in, second-level domain used for universities in India